Stoilești is a commune located in Vâlcea County, Muntenia, Romania. It is composed of fifteen villages: Balomireasa, Bârsoiu, Bulagei, Delureni, Geamăna, Ghiobești, Giuroiu, Izvoru Rece, Malu, Nețești, Obogeni, Stănești, Stoilești, Urși and Vlădulești.

References

Communes in Vâlcea County
Localities in Muntenia